Stranger at My Door may refer to:
 Stranger at My Door (1991 film), an American made-for-television thriller drama film
 Stranger at My Door (1956 film), an American Western film